Birdman (1999) was the first novel of British crime-writer Mo Hayder. It introduced her protagonist Detective Inspector Jack Caffery.

Plot summary
Caffery gets involved in the frightening case of five murdered women whose mutilated corpses are found in the outskirts of London. His investigation yields a treasure trove of abominations. Caffery knows his department is looking in the wrong place for the perpetrator, but he cannot guess at the forces he is up against, or the true darkness of a killer's heart. The manhunt builds as a killer is cornered. The sequel is The Treatment.

External links 
Official author website
Interview: Mo Hayder, The Telegraph
Review from The Guardian
Review from The Observer

1999 British novels
British crime novels
1999 debut novels
Novels about serial killers
Bantam Books books